Dr Ashok Shekar Ganguly  noted industry expert and former chairman of Hindustan Lever, was a nominated member of the Rajya Sabha. His term ended on 17 November 2015.

Early life and education
He was born on 28 July 1935 in Patna to Sekhar Nath and Binapani Ganguly. He was educated at the Master Tutorial High School, Mumbai, and obtained his B.Sc. degree from the Jaihind College, Mumbai.  He completed his M.S. in 1959 and Ph.D. in 1961 from  the University of Illinois Department of Food Science and Human Nutrition, College of Agriculture, Consumer and Environmental Sciences.

Career
Much of Dr. Ganguly's  working life has been with Unilever PLC, where he spent over 35 years. He was the Chairman of Hindustan Lever Ltd from 1980 to 1990 and a member of the Unilever Board from 1990 to 1997. Dr. Ganguly has held board level  positions with various other multinationals, including Hindustan Lever, ICI India, British Airways, Wipro, Tata AIG Life Insurance Co, Hemogenomics, and Firstsource Solutions. He was a member of the board of British Airways Plc from 1996 to 2005.

Public Service
Dr Ganguly has been on various advisory boards to governments across the world
 Member, Science Advisory Council to the Prime Minister of India (1985–1989)
 Member,  UK Advisory Board of Research Councils (1991–1994).
 Director on the central board of the Reserve Bank of India (2000–2009)
 Member, Prime Minister of India's Council on Trade and Industry
 Member, Investment commission of India
 Member, India-USA CEO Council
 Member,  National Knowledge Commission, India

Honours and awards
 Padma Vibhushan, 2009
 CBE, 2006
 Padma Bhushan, 1987
 Made Hon Professor by the Chinese Academy of Science, Shanghai (1996)
 Selected as  ‘Outstanding Alumnus’ by University of Illinois in 1997
 Recipient of the International Alumni Award, University of Illinois, 2003 
 Elected Fellow of the Royal Society of Chemistry, 1991
 Honorary Fellowship of Jawaharlal Nehru Centre for Advanced Scientific Research, Bangalore, 1995

References

External links

Businesspeople from Patna
Living people
Recipients of the Padma Vibhushan in trade & industry
1935 births
Nominated members of the Rajya Sabha
Recipients of the Padma Bhushan in trade and industry
Politicians from Patna
20th-century Indian businesspeople